Mwenge is an area in Dar es Salaam, Tanzania, located 8 km north west of the Dar es Salaam central business district around the intersection of Bagamoyo Road and Sam Nujoma Road. Mwenge is especially known for the large Makonde community market where ebony sculptures and other crafts are sold. The market is a major tourist attraction of Dar es Salaam. Several shops have adjacent workshops where visitors are invited to watch Makonde sculptors at work. Mwenge is one of the main daladala (share taxi) stations of Dar es Salaam; uncountable daladalas go back and forth from Mwenge to the Dar es Salaam central business district), as well as other destinations, throughout the day.

Dar es Salaam